Abu Hummus, also Abu Humus, Abu Hommos, Abu Homos, Abou Homs is a town in Beheira Governorate, Egypt, an administrative center of markaz Abu Hummus.

The old name of the town is Shubra Bar which Ramzi derives from Chabriou Kome named after Chabrias. Gauthier derives the modern name from Egyptian hap-m-s "which hides what is in it". Abu Hummus spans between the Cairo-Alexandria Agricultural Road and the El-Mahmoudeya Canal.

Markaz
, the population of the markaz Abu Hummus was estimated at 348,000. The markaz is known as the site of the Nakhla meteorite.

Notable people
Younes Makhioun

References

Populated places in Beheira Governorate